Stanisław Dzedziński (died 1573) was a Roman Catholic prelate who served as Auxiliary Bishop of Poznań (1568–1573) and Titular Bishop of Aenus (1568–1573).

Biography
On 3 December 1568, Stanisław Dzedziński was appointed during the papacy of Pope Pius V as Auxiliary Bishop of Poznań and Titular Bishop of Aenus. On 21 December 1568, he was consecrated bishop by Otto Truchseß von Waldburg, Cardinal-Bishop of Albano, with Giulio Antonio Santorio, Archbishop of Santa Severina, and William Chisholm, Bishop of Dunblane, serving as co-consecrators. He served as Auxiliary Bishop of Poznań until his death in 1573.

References 

16th-century Roman Catholic bishops in Poland
Bishops appointed by Pope Pius V
1573 deaths